Ryan Spencer Reed (born 1979) is an American social documentary photographer. He has worked in Central and East Africa in the capacity of a photojournalist, covering the Sudanese Diaspora, since 2002. After returning from covering the War in Darfur in summer 2004, he and his work have moved around North America to universities in the form of traveling exhibitions and lectures. The Open Society Institute & Soros Foundation awarded him with the Documentary Photography Project's Distribution Grant in 2006.

While exhibiting and speaking internationally on the subject of Sudan, Reed has photographed extensively on the hubris of power amidst the twilight of the American industrial revolution, which is touring in exhibition form. Since Spring of 2012, Reed took on a long-term project on the modern incarnation of the Band of Brothers: 506th Parachute Infantry Regiment of the 101st Airborne through training and a deployment to Afghanistan. This work was unveiled in its entirety at the Grand Rapids Art Museum in the Fall of 2014. The work aims to catalyze a dialogue on the dissonance between the myths and realities of war.

Group exhibitions

New York Historical Society, New York, NY
Field Museum of Natural History, Chicago, IL 
Jewish Museum Berlin, GERMANY
United States Holocaust Memorial Museum, Washington DC
National Constitution Center, Philadelphia, PA
Cairo Opera House, Egypt
Jardin Du Trocadero, Paris, FRANCE
National Museum of Bosnia and Herzegovina, Sarajevo
Holocaust Centre, Cape Town, SOUTH AFRICA
George Eastman House, Rochester, NY 
Ortaköy Peir Square, Istanbul, TURKEY
Gare do Oriente’s Main Square, Lisbon, PORTUGAL
Guthrie Theater, Minneapolis, MN
La Casa Encendida, Madrid, Spain
Musée des beaux-arts de Montréal, CANADA
Institute of Contemporary Art, Boston, MA
Centro Internazionale de Fotografia (FORMA), Milan, ITALY
International Center of Photography, New York, NY
Royal Ontario Museum, Toronto, CANADA
Grand Rapids Art Museum, Grand Rapids, MI
Museu de les Ciències Príncipe Felipe, Valencia, SPAIN
City Museum of Ljubljana, Ljubljana, SLOVENIJA
Hammer Museum, Los Angeles, CA
Ban Jelačić Square, Zagreb, CROATIA
Sun Valley Center for the Arts, Sun Valley, ID 
Schouwburg Cultural Center, Rotterdam, NETHERLANDS
Stockholm International Fairs, SWEDEN 
University of the Witwatersrand, Senate House, Johannesburg, SOUTH AFRICA
University of South Africa, Pretoria, SOUTH AFRICA
Brown University List Art Center, Providence, RI
Detroit Public Library, Detroit, MI
Scottsdale Center for the Performing Arts, Scottsdale, AZ
Spertus Institute, Chicago, IL
Galerie Mirchandani+Steinruecke, India
Ana Tzarev Gallery, New York
The LUMIX Festival for Young Photojournalism, Hanover, GERMANY

Solo exhibitions

Harvard Law School, Massachusetts
Michigan State University College of Law, Michigan
Northwestern University, Illinois; 
Swarthmore College, Pennsylvania 
Kean University, New Jersey; 
Temple Sholom Chicago, Illinois  
University of Colorado at Boulder, Colorado
Bucknell University, Pennsylvania
City Waukegan/Urban Edge Gallery, Illinois
Wilkes University, Pennsylvania
Richard App Gallery, Michigan
Naples Holocaust Museum, Florida
SRI in the Rockies Conference, British Columbia, Canada
Ohio Wesleyan University, Ohio
Calvin College, Michigan
Huntington University, Indiana
 Jackson Symphony Orchestra, Michigan
Grace Presbyterian, Alberta, Canada 
Birmingham-Southern College, Alabama
Ogden Arts, Utah
Concordia University, Michigan 
Dordt College, Iowa
Samford University, Tennessee
Hope College, Michigan
Ann Arbor District Library, Michigan
Muskegon Community College, Michigan

Visiting artist lectures

Field Museum of Natural History, Chicago, Illinois
Harvard University, Boston, Massachusetts
Glenbow Museum, Alberta Canada
Yale University, New Haven, Connecticut
University of Calgary, Alberta, Canada
Detroit Public Library, Detroit, Michigan
Kean University, New Jersey
University of Vermont, Burlington, Vermont
Weber State University Convocation, Ogden, Utah
King's College, Wilkes-Barre, Pennsylvania 
Furman University, South Carolina
Grand Valley State University, Grand Rapids, Michigan
University of Illinois, Springfield, Illinois

In addition to nearly all of the aforementioned solo exhibition venues

Awards

Pictures of the Year International (POYi) 2015 World Understanding Award Judges' Special Recognition "Despite Similarities to Reality"
Photolucida 2015 Critical Mass Top 50 "Despite Similarities to Reality"
Leica Oskar Barnack Award 2015 Finalist and Public Award Winner
Freedom to Create Prize, "Sudan: The Cost of Silence
Open Society Foundations & Soros Foundation Documentary Photography Project Distribution Grant, "Sudan: The Cost of Silence"

Selected publications
This is Not a Requiem for Detroit Virginia Quarterly Review, Spring 2011, pp. 124–147.
Detroit Forsaken, Ryan Spencer Reed Photo Technique Magazine, March/April 2011.
"Darfur/Darfur: Life/War." New York: DK Melcher Media, 2008. . Reed is one of the eight photographers of this book.
Google Earth Mapping Initiatives: Crisis in Darfur Layers. Reed is one of the seven photographers.

References

External links
Government Operations Committee Testimony on Sudan Divestment- HOUSE BILL No. 4854 July 24, 2007
Website of Ryan Spencer Reed and The Cost of Silence Exhibitions

1979 births
Living people
American photojournalists
War photographers